In the Valais region of Switzerland, a cholera is a savoury pastry filled with potatoes, vegetables, fruits and cheese.

Originally, the local ingredients for such a dish were apples, pears, potatoes, onions, leeks, raclette cheese (usually Gomser) and bacon. The dish is mostly known in the region of Valais within Switzerland.

Etymology 
The origin of the unusual name for the dish remains unclear:

A folk etymological explanation purports that during an epidemic of the disease cholera in 1836, people in the region improvised a dish involving pastry and whatever food they had at hand, as normal trade was disrupted. After the epidemic subsided, chefs returned to the concept of putting regional ingredients in a savoury tart, and the "cholera" dish has lasted since.

Alternatively,  is also the Valais German term for a specific room within a bakery where coal would be gathered.

References

External links
Cholera, a Valaisian art form. MySwitzerland.com. Retrieved 15 July 2013.

Swiss cuisine
Swiss pastries
Valais
Savoury pies
Tarts
Potato dishes
Bacon dishes
Cheese dishes